Venusia sikkimensis is a moth in the family Geometridae first described by William Warren in 1893. It can be found in Bhutan, Nepal, India and China.

References

Moths described in 1893
Venusia (moth)